King Gambrinus is a public artwork by American artist Carl Kuehns, which depicts Gambrinus, and which is located in the courtyard of the Best Place tavern and hall at the former site of the Pabst Brewing Company Former Corporate Office Building, that is near downtown Milwaukee, WI, United States.

Description
The statue features a standing, bearded King Gambrius in blue clothing with a red and white cape holding a flagon of beer in his right hand. The figure wears black boots, a studded belt, and a crown. He directs his gaze toward the uplifted glass of beer and rests his other hand on his thick waist. Behind his feet rests a wooden beer barrel. The painted metal sculpture weighs 900 lbs.

Historical information
The original King Gambrinus was carved in wood by Gustav Haug and installed at the roof peak of the Pabst Brewhouse in 1857. The company grew quickly and expanded its complex such that by 1872 a new statue was needed. Carl Kuehns, a carver with the Matthew Brothers Furniture Company, created a copy of Haug's wooden sculpture and the new work was installed atop an archway leading to the loading yard. The wooden sculpture gradually deteriorated, and in 1966, the new cast aluminum version was commissioned. It stood atop the entrance to the brewery's Stirnewert until 1996, when the brewery closed. The original wood sculpture by Kuehns was sold to a developer in Ozaukee County. From 1997 to 2004, the aluminum statue was stored at Milwaukee's Miller Brewing, a contract brewer for Pabst.

Location history
The King Gambrinus statue was removed in 1996 upon the closing of the Pabst Brewery. From 2004 to 2011, the statue was installed in the employee cafeteria at the Illinois headquarters of Pabst. Best Place operator Jim Haertel negotiated a loan of the sculpture to return it to its original site.

See also
 Pabst Brewery Complex

References

External links
King Gambrinus Legendary Patron of Brewing.
King Gambrinus. Who Was He?.
Statue of the good King Gambrinus.

Outdoor sculptures in Milwaukee
1967 sculptures
1857 sculptures
Wooden sculptures in Wisconsin
Aluminum sculptures in Wisconsin